Valeri Zhukov (sometimes listed as Valery Zhukov) (born February 8, 1988) is a professional ice hockey player who plays for PSK Sakhalin in the Asia League Ice Hockey (ALIH). He has formerly played with Torpedo Nizhny Novgorod in the Kontinental Hockey League (KHL).

External links

1988 births
Living people
Ariada Volzhsk players
HC Kuban players
Molot-Prikamye Perm players
Neftyanik Almetyevsk players
Sportspeople from Nizhny Novgorod
Russian ice hockey defencemen
PSK Sakhalin players
HC Sarov players
Torpedo Nizhny Novgorod players
Zauralie Kurgan players